Bakonyszentlászló is a village in Győr-Moson-Sopron county, Hungary.

In the 19th and 20th centuries, a small Jewish community lived in the village, in 1880 30 Jews lived in the village, most of whom were murdered in the Holocaust. The community had a Jewish cemetery.

References

External links 
 Street map 

Populated places in Győr-Moson-Sopron County
Jewish communities destroyed in the Holocaust